The Akaa Falls is located near the Akyeremanteng village in the Akuapem North District, is about 21 kilometres northeast of Koforidua in the Eastern Region of Ghana. Akaa Falls is barely seven kilometres away from Boti Falls and takes it source from the Boti river, the very river from which the Boti Falls takes its source.

See also 
 Umbrella Rock

References 

Waterfalls of Ghana